The Indian River Citrus Museum is located at 2140 14th Avenue, Vero Beach, Florida.  It houses an exhibit on the citrus industry in Indian River County.

Notes

External links
The Heritage Center and Indian River Citrus Museum (official website)
Indian River Citrus Museum/Heritage Center Vero Beach, Florida. Museum Info webpage from MuseumUSA.org.

Industry museums in Florida
Museums in Indian River County, Florida
Buildings and structures in Vero Beach, Florida
Agriculture museums in the United States
Citrus industry in Florida